Cyprian Mrzygłód (pronounced ; born 2 February 1998) is a Polish athlete specialising in the javelin throw. He won the gold medal at the 2017 European U20 Championships. In his senior major international debut he finished ninth at the 2018 European Championships.

His personal best in the event is 84.97 metres set in Gävle in 2019.

International competitions

References

1998 births
Polish male javelin throwers
Olympic athletes of Poland
Living people
People from Łowicz County
Athletes (track and field) at the 2020 Summer Olympics